William Jenkinson (2 March 1892 – 3 April 1967) was an English footballer who played as a defender for Liverpool and  Wigan Borough.

References

External links
 LFC History profile

1892 births
1967 deaths
English footballers
Liverpool F.C. players
Wigan Borough F.C. players
Association football fullbacks